Lieutenant General Sir Simon Vincent Mayall,  (born 7 March 1956) is a retired British Army officer and a Middle East Adviser at the Ministry of Defence.

Early life
Mayall was educated at St George's College, Weybridge, Balliol College, Oxford (Bachelor of Arts in Modern History, 1979) and King's College London (Master of Arts in International Relations).

Military career
Mayall was commissioned into the 15th/19th The King's Royal Hussars in 1979. From 1985 to 1988 he was seconded to the Sultan of Oman's Land Forces. He was operations officer for the 1st Armoured Division in the Gulf War. After that he completed a Defence Fellowship at St Antony's College, Oxford studying Turkish security policy. He then became Commanding Officer of 1st The Queen's Dragoon Guards in 1997, in which capacity he was deployed to the British Army Training Unit Suffield and to Northern Ireland.

In 2001 Mayall became Commander of 1st Mechanised Brigade, which was subsequently deployed to Kosovo. He received the Queen's Commendation for Valuable Service in recognition of his "distinguished services" on the deployment. Mayall was the Deputy Commanding General of the Multi-National Corps – Iraq in late 2006 and early 2007, for which he was awarded an Officer of the Legion of Merit by the United States. He was appointed Assistant Chief of the General Staff in January 2007 and, in 2009, became Deputy Chief of the Defence Staff (Operations). He was appointed a Companion of the Order of the Bath in the 2010 New Year Honours, and made Defence Senior Advisor Middle East at the Ministry of Defence in May 2011. He was replaced in that role by Lieutenant General Tom Beckett in late 2014, having been appointed a Knight Commander of the Order of the British Empire in the 2014 Birthday Honours.

Post-retirement
In 2015, Mayall retired from military service and joined Greenhill & Co., an investment bank, as a senior advisor. On 25 February 2015, he was appointed Lieutenant of the Tower of London. He retired from that post on 20 August 2021.

References

|-

|-

1956 births
1st The Queen's Dragoon Guards officers
15th/19th The King's Royal Hussars officers
Alumni of Balliol College, Oxford
Alumni of King's College London
British Army generals
British Army personnel of the Gulf War
British Army personnel of the Iraq War
Companions of the Order of the Bath
Knights Commander of the Order of the British Empire
Living people
Officers of the Legion of Merit
People educated at St George's College, Weybridge
Recipients of the Commendation for Valuable Service